KIMO (107.3 FM, "The Mighty Mo 107FM") is a commercial radio station located in Townsend, Montana and serves the Helena area. KIMO airs a country music format and is owned by the Montana Radio Company.

History of call letters
The call letters KIMO were previously assigned to an AM station in Independence, Missouri.

HD Radio
In August 2017 KIMO-HD4 launched an active rock format, branded as "Rock 96.3" (simulcast on translator K242CX 96.3 FM Helena), and 
KIMO-HD2 launched a variety hits format, branded as "104.5 Dave FM" (simulcast on translator K283BP 104.5 FM Helena). The former was re-located from a station divested by the company.

References

External links
Montana Radio Website

IMO
Country radio stations in the United States